Benjamin Vidaic (born 29 January 1988 in Sydney) is a retired Australian footballer of Croatian origin.

Early life
He is of Croat origin, and attended the Trinity Grammar School in Summer Hill where he was Captain of Soccer. Vidaic has also represented Australia internationally, playing for the Qantas Joeys (Under 17s) and Qantas Young Socceroos (Under 20s), scoring five goals in eight appearances.

Club career
In July 2007, Ben began trialling at Sydney FC as the club began pre-season training.  After scoring in friendly against Sydney University and making a number of substitute appearances in Pre-Season Cup matches, the club signed him to a two-year contract. Former Sydney FC coach Branko Culina declared that "Ben has great potential and I'm confident he'll push for a place in the team,". Upon signing, Ben commented that "It's a dream come true to sign with Sydney FC, the best club in the A-League," said the youngster.  Vidaic made two appearances in the A-League in his first season, both off the bench.

On 27 November 2007, Vidaic took part in an exhibition match against Los Angeles Galaxy, coming off the bench early in the second half. He also played for the club in the Pan-Pacific Championship 2008 in Hawaii.

It was announced at the end of the season that he would return to Sydney United on loan while the A-League was in off-season and return to the club for pre-season training in April. However, on 18 March 2008, his contract with Sydney FC was terminated by mutual consent, making his move to United permanent.

Ben's father, Bruno Vidaic, also played for Sydney United (formerly Sydney Croatia) captaining the club in the 80's and is considered a club great.

Benny as he is known at the strikers, has currently appeared in almost every match scoring numerous goals. Today’s goal was particularly sublime with a deft touch and rocket finish. Also his trademark celebration the ‘conquistador wave’ did not make an appearance.

References

External links
Sydney FC profile
Marconi player profile

1988 births
Living people
Soccer players from Sydney
Sydney FC players
Australian people of Croatian descent
A-League Men players
Blacktown City FC players
Sydney United 58 FC players
Marconi Stallions FC players
Association football forwards
Australian soccer players